Gorno Harsovo is a village in Blagoevgrad Municipality, in Blagoevgrad Province, Bulgaria. It is situated in Rila mountain 5 kilometers east of Blagoevgrad. There is no electrical power in parts of the village yet.

References

Villages in Blagoevgrad Province